Faiyum Sporting Club, is an Egyptian football club based in Faiyum, Egypt. The club is currently playing in the Egyptian Second Division, the second-highest league in the Egyptian football league system.

Egyptian Second Division
Football clubs in Egypt

وفريق الكرة الطائرة كان شاهد لعب مباراة سابقا ودية مع فريق استاد قنا المحترم وكان أبرز اللاعبين في المبارة وراجل المباراة يوسف جمال حيث تم تسليمه درع نادي الفيوم